Gorenje Selce is a small settlement in the Municipality of Trebnje in eastern Slovenia. It lies just north of Dolenje Selce and west of Knežja Vas. The area is part of the historical region of Lower Carniola. The municipality is now included in the Southeast Slovenia Statistical Region.

References

External links
Gorenje Selce at Geopedia

Populated places in the Municipality of Trebnje